Fiddle Peak was named by James Hector in 1858. It is located in the Fiddle Range of Jasper National Park, Alberta, Canada.

References

Two-thousanders of Alberta
Mountains of Jasper National Park